The Trucks and Bus Company (TBCo or T&BC) is a Libyan manufacturer of trucks and buses. It was a joint-venture between the Italian Industrial Vehicles Corporation and the Libyan Secretariat of Industry and Mineral Resources.

TBCo was founded in 1976 with its head office in Tajura. A second manufacturing plant was opened in Tripoli. In late 2011, the company was closed by the provisional government after the Libyan Civil War.

References
 Production re start in March 2012.

External links
Official Website of the Trucks and Bus Company
Used Trucks

Truck manufacturers of Libya
Vehicle manufacturing companies established in 1976
Vehicle manufacturing companies disestablished in 2011
1976 establishments in Libya
2011 disestablishments in Libya
Defunct companies of Libya
Iveco
Bus manufacturers of Libya